Elias Selah Holliday (March 5, 1842 – March 13, 1936) was an American lawyer,  Civil War veteran, and politician who served four terms as a U.S. Representative from Indiana from 1901 to 1909.

Early life and career 
Born in Aurora, Indiana, Holliday spent the early part of his life on farms in Indiana, Missouri, and Iowa.
He attended the common schools and taught in the public schools in Iowa.

Civil War 
During the Civil War enlisted in the Fifth Kansas Regiment and served until August 12, 1864, when he was mustered out with the rank of first sergeant.

Legal career 
He attended Hartsville College, Bartholomew County, Indiana.
He engaged in teaching in Jennings County, Indiana.
He studied law at Mount Vernon, Indiana.
He was admitted to the bar in 1873 and commenced practice in Carbon, Indiana.

Political career 
He moved to Brazil, Indiana, in 1874.
He served as mayor of Brazil 1877–1880, 1887, and 1888.
City attorney in 1884.
He served as member of the city council 1892–1896.

Congress 
Holliday was elected as a Republican to the Fifty-seventh and to the three succeeding Congresses (March 4, 1901 – March 3, 1909).
He was not a candidate for renomination in 1908.
Reengaged in the practice of law in Brazil until 1922.

Death
He died in Brazil, Indiana, March 13, 1936.
He was interred in Cottage Hill Cemetery.

References

External links

1842 births
1936 deaths
People from Aurora, Indiana
People of Indiana in the American Civil War
United States Army soldiers
People from Brazil, Indiana
Indiana lawyers
20th-century American politicians

Republican Party members of the United States House of Representatives from Indiana